This is a list of notable people who were born, spent a majority of their life, or currently live in San Diego, California.

A
 Anderson Lee Aldrich, convicted gunman of the 2022 Colorado Springs nightclub shooting
 Marcus Allen, professional player and analyst, college and Pro Football Hall of Famer
 Eric Allen, professional football player, coach, and analyst
 Paul Arriola, professional soccer player
 Brian Awadis, professional YouTuber

B
 Greg Bear, sci-fi novelist; won two Hugo awards; co-founder, San Diego Comic-Con
 David Bailey, professional motocross racer
 Dr. Charlotte Johnson Baker, San Diego's first practicing woman physician
 Dr. Fred Baker, physician, founder of the Scripps Institution of Oceanography
 Khalif Barnes, professional football player
 Arlene Baxter, model and actress
 Billy Beane, general manager of Oakland Athletics, portrayed by Brad Pitt in Moneyball
 Brie Bella, professional wrestler, one-time WWE Divas Champion
 Nikki Bella, professional wrestler, two-time WWE Divas Champion
 Belle Benchley, "The Zoo Lady," President, San Diego Zoo 1927–53, first woman in world to direct major zoo
 Charles Benefiel, outsider artist
 Annette Bening, TV, stage and screen actress, four-time Oscar nominee
 Kurt Benirschke, pathologist and geneticist
 Rolf Benirschke, professional football player
 Doug Benson, professional comedian
 Shari Benstock, feminist literary scholar and University of Miami English department chair
 Peter Berkos, Academy Award winner for sound editing
 Wynton Bernard, professional baseball player
 Noah Bernardo, drummer for band P.O.D.
 Rhett Bernstein, professional soccer player
 Camren Bicondova, dancer
 Mayim Bialik, TV actress (Blossom, The Big Bang Theory)
 Tony Bill, actor, director, and Academy Award-winning producer
 Stephen Bishop, musician
 Ron Blair, musician, original bassist of band Tom Petty and the Heartbreakers
 Hank Blalock, professional baseball player
 Jolene Blalock, actress, Star Trek: Enterprise
 Kim Bokamper, professional football player
 Bob Boone, professional baseball player
 Eddie Borysewciz, US Olympic Cycling Coach, United States Bicycling Hall of Fame
 Madge Bradley, attorney and judge; first woman appointed to San Diego County bench
 Allison Bradshaw, professional tennis player
 Tim Bradstreet, artist and illustrator
 Debbie Bramwell-Washington, IFBB professional bodybuilder
 Charles Brandes, investment manager, billionaire
 Steven Brault, professional baseball player
 Quentin Breese, professional boxer
 Lucille Bremer, actress
 Adam Brody, actor, The O.C.
 Bill Brown, music composer
 Victor Buono, actor
 Charles F. Buddy, first bishop of Roman Catholic Diocese of San Diego, University of San Diego founder
 Chase Budinger, professional basketball player
Jud Buechler, former professional basketball player, NBA coach
 Bob Burnquist, professional skateboarder
 Nakia Burrise, actress, best known for portraying the third Yellow Power Ranger, Tanya Sloan
 Eileen Rose Busby, author, antiques expert
 Reggie Bush, professional football player
 Brian Patrick Butler, actor and filmmaker
 Darryl Byrd, professional football player
 Chris Byrd, professional boxer, Olympic Silver Medalist, two-time Heavyweight Champion

C
 John Castellanos, stage, film and television actor, film producer
 Donna Campbell, physician and member of the Texas Senate, born in San Diego in 1954
 Charlie Cannon, singer, theater performer and co-founder of Starlight Opera
 Nick Cannon, actor, rapper, occasional TV host
 Francesca Capaldi, actress (Dog with a Blog)
 Billy Casper, golfer, Masters and U.S. Open champion
 Emma Caulfield, actress
 Mark Cerney, founder of Next of Kin Registry (NOKR)
 David Chadwick, clinical research pediatrician, author, founder of Chadwick Center for Children and Autism Discovery Institute-San Diego
 Kate Morgan Chadwick, actress, singer
 Raymond Chandler, detective novelist and film noir writer; "The Big Sleep," "Farewell, My Lovely," "The Long Goodbye"
 Eric Chavez, professional baseball player
 Steve Cherundolo, professional soccer player
 Bob Clampett, animator (Looney Tunes)
 Judy Clarke, criminal defense attorney
Jamie Clayton, actress and model
 Eric Close, actor
 D. C. Collier, real estate developer, director of the 1915–16 Panama California Exposition
 Aukai Collins, Chechen mujahideen, spent his childhood in Ocean Beach, and part of his early adulthood in City Heights
 Marshall Colt, psychologist and former actor
 Holly Marie Combs, actress Picket Fences, Charmed
 Dennis Conner, America's Cup yachtsman
 Maureen Connolly, professional tennis player, 1953 tennis Grand Slam champion
 Derrike Cope, NASCAR driver
 Salvatore J. Cordileone, Roman Catholic archbishop
 Jorge Cordova, professional football player
 Alana Cordy-Collins, anthropologist
 William P. Cronan, naval officer and 19th Naval Governor of Guam
 Robbin Crosby, musician
 Rob Crow, musician
 Cameron Crowe, screenwriter, director, and producer
 Dominick Cruz, mixed martial artist, former UFC bantamweight champion
 Andrew Cunanan, spree killer who murdered Gianni Versace
 Marcos Curiel, musician

D
 Austin da Luz, professional soccer player
 John D'Acquisto, professional baseball player
 Ted Danson, Emmy Award-winning actor (Cheers, Becker, CSI)
 Mike Davis, professional baseball player
 Terrell Davis, professional football player
 William Heath Davis, early San Diego developer
 Jean Dawson, musician
 Luca de la Torre, professional soccer player
 Liza del Mundo, actress
 Tom Delonge, singer and musician
 Warren DeMartini, musician
 Thatcher Demko, goaltender for the Vancouver Canucks
 Doug DeMuro, automotive columnist, reviewer, and author
 Amir Derakh, musician
 Cameron Diaz, actress (My Best Friend's Wedding, Charlie's Angels)
 John P. Dolan, Catholic bishop
 Patrice Donnelly, athlete and actress
 Johnny Downs, vaudevillian, dancer, actor, TV personality
 Gerry Driscol, yacht racer and businessperson
 Adam Driver, actor
 Jared Dudley, professional basketball player
 Ryan Drummond, actor, voice actor, comedian, singer (Voice of Sonic the Hedgehog from 1998 to 2004)
 Momčilo Đujić, WW2 Chetnik guerilla commander
 Robert Duvall, Oscar-winning actor

E
Nathan East, bass player
 Jason Earles, actor
 Donnie Edwards, professional football player
 Bob Elliott, professional baseball player
 Lindsay Ellingson, model
Boogie Ellis, basketball player
 Joan Embery, animal and environmental advocate
 Iris Engstrand, professor emeritus of history at University of San Diego, author of 
 Hayden Epstein, professional football player
 Gary Erwin, TV personality

F
 Daeg Faerch, actor
 Marshall Faulk, professional football player, Hall of Famer
 Raymond E. Feist, author
 Amy Finley, cook, author
 John William Finn, Medal of Honor recipient
 Reuben H. Fleet, aviation pioneer, industrialist, Army officer
 Jon Foreman, lead vocalist and guitarist for band Switchfoot
 Tim Foreman, bassist and backing vocalist for band Switchfoot
 Arian Foster, professional football player
 Julie Foudy, professional soccer player
 Dan Fouts, professional football player, media analyst, Hall of Famer
 Frankie J, singer
 Ace Frehley, lead guitarist for band KISS
 Mike Fuentes, musician, drummer for band Pierce the Veil
 Vic Fuentes, musician, vocalist and rhythm guitarist for band Pierce the Veil

G
 Lukas Gage, actor
 Diamanda Galás, composer, vocalist, and keyboard artist
 Ray Gallardo, film director and cinematographer
 Greg Garcia, professional baseball player
 Maruta Gardner, educator, community activist
 Major Garrett, reporter
 Steve Garvey, professional baseball player, businessman
 Jeff Gianola, television news anchor
 Brian Giles, professional baseball player
 Marcus Giles, professional baseball player
 Jared S. Gilmore, child actor
 Francoise Gilot, painter, author
 Broc Glover, motocross national champion
 La'Roi Glover, professional football player
Mark Goffeney, guitarist born without arms, disability advocate
 Susan Golding, businesswoman, politician
 Stephen Gonsalves, professional baseball player
 Adrián González, professional baseball player
 Sandra Good, former Manson Family member
 Andrew Good, professional baseball player
 Edgar Gott, aviation industry executive
 Mark Grace, professional baseball player
 Robert Klark Graham, businessman and eugenicist
 Cecil H. Green, geophysicist, philanthropist
 Harold Greene, television journalist
 Robbie Grossman, professional baseball player 
 Alejandro Guido, professional soccer player
 Manuel Gutierrez (aka Manny MUA), YouTuber
 Tony Gwynn, professional baseball player and coach, Hall of Famer, won 8 batting titles
 Tony Gwynn Jr., professional baseball player, son of Tony Gwynn

H
 Leon Hall, professional football player
 Cole Hamels, professional baseball player
 Rosie Hamlin, singer
 Jonathan Hammond, film director and screenwriter
Jaylen Hands, professional basketball player
 Aaron Harang, professional baseball player, attended San Diego State
 Mike Harkey, Major League Baseball pitcher and coach
 Margo Harshman, actress
 Charles Mallory Hatfield, rainmaker
 Riley Hawk, professional skateboarder, son of Tony Hawk
 Tony Hawk, professional skateboarder
 Le Ly Hayslip, memoirist and humanitarian 
 Len Heard, darts player
 Roger Hedgecock, mayor and radio personality
 David Hensley, MLB infielder
 Arthur Hobbs, professional football player
 James Holmes, convicted gunman of the 2012 Aurora, Colorado shooting
 Dennis Hopper, actor and director (Easy Rider, Speed)
 Mark Hoppus, singer and musician
 Alonzo Horton, early San Diego developer, created "New Town San Diego", later Downtown
 James Oliver Huberty, perpetrator of San Ysidro McDonald's Massacre
 Kimberly Hunt, news anchor
 Joe Hutshing, Oscar-winning film editor
 Faithe Herman, actress

I & J
 Gabriel Iglesias, stand-up comedian
 Christofer Drew Ingle, musician
 Doug Ingle, founder of band Iron Butterfly, primary creator of In-A-Gadda-Da-Vida, first platinum record
 JabbaWockeeZ, dance crew
 Father Luís Jayme, California's first Christian martyr
 Jayo Felony, rapper
 Tony Jefferson, professional football player
 Kris Jenner, television personality
 Johnny Jeter, professional wrestler
 Deron Johnson, professional baseball player
 Jimmie Johnson, NASCAR driver, seven-time champion
 Katrina Johnson, actress
 Michael Johnson (aka Twisted Insane), rapper
 Adam Jones, professional baseball player
 Dhani Jones, professional football player
 Jacque Jones, professional baseball player
 Lonnie Jordan, musician, War
 Ian Joy, professional soccer player, sports broadcaster
 Jazzmun, actress
 David Justice, professional baseball player
 James Holmes, perpetrator of the 2012 Aurora shooting.

K
 Lori Kay, artist
 Kendrick Bangs Kellogg, architect
 Kerri Kendall, model
 Jewel Kilcher, Grammy-nominated singer
 Tawny Kitaen, model and actress
 Laurence Monroe Klauber, herpetologist
 Charles Klusmann, escaped from Vietnamese POW camp 1964
 Ken Kocher, professional football player
 Raph Koster, author and game designer
 Joel Kramer, basketball player
 Joan Kroc, philanthropist
 Ray Kroc, founder of the McDonald's corporation, owned San Diego Padres
 Alice K. Kurashige, first Japanese-American woman to be commissioned in US Marine Corps

L
 Frankie Laine, singer and actor
 Adam Lambert, singer, runner-up on American Idol
 Tim Lambesis, vocalist for band As I Lay Dying
 Fabio Lanzoni, model
 Bob Larsen, track and field coach, Olympic coach
 Don Larsen, professional baseball player, pitched perfect game in 1956 World Series
 Joe Lara, actor
 Bucky Lasek, professional skateboarder
 Tammy Lauren, actress
 Robbie Lawler, mixed martial artist
 Brad Leaf, American-Israeli basketball player
 Bessie Learn, silent film actress
 Bobby Lee, MadTV actor and comedian
 David Leisure, "Joe Isuzu," character actor and comedian (Empty Nest)
 Jeanne Lenhart, senior Olympian, senior pageant winner, performing arts teacher
 Joe Leonard Automobile and Motorcycle champion
 William S. Lerach, securities class action attorney, investor advocate
 lê thi diem thúy, novelist and performance artist, "The Gangster We Are All Looking For" (2004)
 Cliff Levingston, professional basketball player
 Lil Rob, Chicano rapper
Cassidy Lichtman, professional volleyball player
 Art Linkletter, television personality
 Cleavon Little, actor, Blazing Saddles
 Gene Littler, professional golfer, World Golf Hall of Famer
 Harold Lloyd, silent film actor
 John Logan, screenwriter
 Mario López, actor and television personality (Saved by the Bell, Extra!)
 Greg Louganis, Olympic gold-medalist diver
 Moses A. Luce, lawyer

M
 John Macaulay, professional football player
 Rob Machado, professional surfer
 Doug Manchester, real estate developer, owner of The San Diego Union-Tribune
 Gloria Marks, All-American Girls Professional Baseball League player
 Ross Martin, actor, The Wild Wild West
 Tate Martell, college football player, Netflix Original QB1: Beyond the Lights
 Clay Marzo, professional surfer
 James Maslow, actor, singer from boy band Big Time Rush
 Victor Mature, actor, Kiss of Death
 Maria Goeppert Mayer, scientist, worked at Los Alamos; Nobel Prize in physics, 1963
 Mercedes McCambridge, Oscar-winning actress, star of radio, TV, stage and screen
 Bill McColl, professional football player and surgeon
 William C. McCool, astronaut
 Kyle McDonald, singer and musician
 Tug McGraw, professional baseball player, father of country singer Tim McGraw
 Danica McKellar, author and actress (The Wonder Years)
 Michael Medved, radio host, political commentator, film critic
 Dan Melville, football player
 Bob Mendoza, professional baseball player and coach, San Diego Hall of Champions inductee
 Cordelia Mendoza, antiques expert, businesswoman, author
 Shep Meyers, musician
 Phil Mickelson, professional golfer, Masters and British Open champion
 Martin Milner, actor, Adam-12
 Lani Minella, voice actress
 Kevin Mitchell, professional baseball player
 Silas Weir Mitchell, actor
 Ron Mix, "the intellectual assassin," professional football player, Hall of Famer
 Matthew Modine, actor, Full Metal Jacket, The Dark Knight Rises
 John J. Montgomery, pioneer aviator
 Kyle Mooney, Saturday Night Live cast member, 2013–present
 Archie Moore, professional boxer
Trevi Moran, singer, YouTuber
 Alex Morgan, professional soccer player, US Women's National Team
 Adam Montoya, YouTube personality, gamer
 Tawny Moyer, actress (Halloween II)
  David Miller, operatic singer/gospel
 Jason Mraz, Grammy-winning singer
 Joe Musgrove, professional baseball player
 Chad Muska, professional skateboarder
 Dominik Mysterio, professional wrestler, son of Rey Mysterio father son tag team champions
 El Hijo de Rey Misterio, professional wrestler
 Rey Mysterio, professional wrestler, WWE Grand Slam Champion first ever father son tag team champions
 Dave McCary, comedian and director

N 
 Kathy Najimy, actress (Sister Act, Hocus Pocus)
 Stephen Neal, professional football player
 Andrew Newmark, activist, musician
 Walter R. Nickel, M.D., dermatologist and dermatopathologist
 Kent Ninomiya, journalist
 Craig Noel, theatre producer
 Matt Nokes, professional baseball player
 Ellen Ochoa, NASA astronaut
 Raymond Ochoa, actor
 Ryan Ochoa, actor
 Ronan O'Gara, professional rugby player
John Ottman, movie film composer
 Heather O'Rourke, actress, Poltergeist
 Alexandrea Owens-Sarno, actress
 Brandon Nakashima, tennis player

O
 Ronan O'Gara, Irish rugby union player (Ireland's second most-capped player and highest ever points scorer) and current coach.
Chris Olave, football player
John Ottman, soundtrack composer

P
 Patti Page, legendary country and pop singer, film actress; real name Clara Ann Fowler
 Carson Palmer, professional football player, Heisman Trophy winner
 Chuck Palumbo, professional wrestler
 Adam Pearce, professional wrestler
 Stephen Pearcy, musician
 Carlton Pearson, televangelist
 Justin Pearson, musician
 Everett Peck, cartoonist, illustrator, animator and creator of Duckman and Squirrel Boy
 Gregory Peck, Oscar-winning actor
 Clarence M. Pendleton Jr., chairman of United States Commission on Civil Rights 1981-88
 Bob Penuelas, cartoonist
 Scott Peterson, convicted murderer
 Craig Peyer, convicted murderer
 Dat Phan, comedian
 Regis Philbin, television personality
 Steve Poltz, singer-songwriter and guitarist
 Zach Porter, singer of Allstar Weekend
 Norman Powell, professional basketball player
 Conrad Prebys, philanthropist
 Jaime Preciado, bass player and vocalist for band Pierce the Veil
 Jenna Presley, actress
 Ben Press, tennis professional and coach
 Barry Pressing, contemporary artist and sculptor
 Gary Puckett, musician and singer
 Sarah Purcell, television personality
Geoffrey Pyatt, diplomat

R
 Sara Ramirez, Tony-winning actress and singer
 Emily Ratajkowski, actress and model
 Scott Raynor, musician
 Autumn Reeser, actress
 Steve Reeves,  actor, bodybuilder, author
 John Reis, musician, swami
 Richard Requa, architect
 Roger Revelle, oceanographer, founder of UCSD
 Sally Ride, astronaut
 Johnny Ritchey, professional baseball player
 Thomas Ridgway, U.S. Army officer and father of General Matthew Ridgway
 Lil Rob, rapper
 Dave Roberts, professional baseball player and manager
 Cliff Robertson, Oscar-winning actor
 Alfred D. Robinson and Marion James Robinson, builders of Rosecroft
 Aaron Rodgers, professional football player
 Mitt Romney, politician
 Tony Romo, professional football player
 Louis Rose, developer
 Seraphim Rose, hieromonk
 Marion Ross, actress, Happy Days
 Neil Ross, voice actor
 Kerry Rossall, actor, Apocalypse Now, stuntman and film producer
 Patrick Rowe, professional football player
 Pete Rozelle, famed publicist, NFL Commissioner
 Ilan Rubin, musician
 Sam Rubin, entertainment reporter
 FaZe Rug, YouTube personality, co-owner of FaZe Clan
 Chad Ruhwedel, professional ice hockey player
 RuPaul, performer, television personality
 Betsy Russell, actress, Saw
 Jason Russell, film director
 Payson R. Stevens, science communicator, artist, environmentalist

S
 Rashaan Salaam, professional football player, Heisman Trophy winner
Shay Rudolph, actress, social media influencer
 Jonas Salk, physician, developed polio vaccine; founder, Salk Institute; Presidential medal of freedom (1977)
 Daniel Samohin (born 1998), Israeli Olympic figure skater
 Jessica Sanchez, American Idol contestant
 Shauna Sand, Playboy model, "Playmate of the Month" for May 1996
 Sonny Sandoval, musician
 David Schipper, professional soccer player
 Cathy Scott, journalist and true-crime author
 J. Michael Scott, senior scientist, environmentalist and author
 Junior Seau, professional football player, Hall of Famer
 Kate Sessions, horticulturalist, "the mother of Balboa Park"
 Dr. Seuss, Pulitzer-prize winning children's author; real name Theodor Geisel
 Stephanie Seymour, model
 Norm Sherry (1931–2021), catcher, manager, and coach in Major League Baseball
 Al Silvera (1935–2002), major league baseball player
 Kerry Simmonds, rower, Olympic gold medalist
 Mary Sinclair, actress
 Andy Skib, musician
 Mitchy Slick, musician
 Sebastian Soto, professional soccer player
 Slightly Stoopid, band
 Alex Smith, professional football player
 Marty Smith, motocross national champion
 Carly Smithson, singer
 Suzy Spafford, artist
 Brenda Spencer, convicted murderer
 John D. Spreckels, businessman and industrialist
 Michael Stamm, Olympic swimmer, national champion
 Scott Stantis, editorial cartoonist
 Anne State, television news anchor 
 Harry L. Steele, US Army major general
 Riley Steele, pornographic actress
 Stephen Strasburg, professional baseball player, 2019 World Series MVP
 Jeremy Stenberg, professional motorcross rider
 Kenny Stills, professional football player
 J. J. Stokes, professional football player
 Milburn Stone, actor, Gunsmoke
 Rob Stone (rapper), rapper
 Frederick S. Strong, US Army major general
 Frederick W. Sturckow, astronaut
 Savannah Sturges, top 10 finalist on MasterChef Season 4
 Karen Hantze Susman, tennis player
 Zachary Svajda, tennis player
 Leslie Sykes, television news anchor

T 
 Dalani Tanahy, American artist specializing in the Hawaiian art of creating kapa
 Roberto Tapia, musician
 Lauren Taylor, American actress and singer
 Brian Teacher (born 1954), tennis player, Australian Open singles champion
 Jonathan Temple (1796–1866), landowner, rancher and politician
 Jamie Thomas, professional skateboarder
 Pete Thomas, American football player
 Susanna Thompson, actress
 Soren Thompson (born 1981), Olympic and world champion épée fencer
 Katherine Tingley, creator of Theosophical Society compound at Lomaland
 Robert Titzer, writer known for Your Baby Can Read! infant learning book
 Levine Toilolo, professional football player
 Ted Tollner, professional football coach
 Jerry Trainor, actor
 Alan Trammell, professional baseball player and manager
 Kelly Marie Tran, actress
 Marty Tripes, winner of first Super Bowl of motocross
 Bitsie Tulloch, actress
 Jeremy Tyler, professional basketball player
 Luca de la Torre, soccer player

U
 Edred Utomi, American stage actor

V
 W.S. Van Dyke, film director
 Tiffany van Soest, kickboxer
 Eddie Vedder, singer in rock band Pearl Jam
 Juli Veee, soccer player
 Craig Venter, biologist, entrepreneur
 Victor Villaseñor, author
 Erik von Detten, American actor (Toy Story, The Princess Diaries)

W
 Tom Waits, singer-songwriter, composer and actor
 Bill Walton, professional basketball player and media analyst, Hall of Famer
 Luke Walton, professional basketball player and coach
 Hubert Webb, convicted
 Kelly Ward, actor
 Danny Way, professional skateboarder
 Harry M. Wegeforth, physician, founder of the San Diego Zoo
 Raquel Welch, Golden Globe Award-winning actress
 Tahnee Welch, model and actress
 David Wells, professional baseball player
 Julie White, Tony Award-winning actress
 Shaun White, professional skateboarder and snowboarder, Olympic gold medalist
 Cole Whitt, NASCAR driver
 Larry Wilcox, actor
 Kendra Wilkinson, model and television personality
 Carol Williams, concert organist, composer
 Damien Williams, professional football player
 Michelle Williams, Oscar-nominated actress
 Mikey Williams, basketball player
 Nathan Williams, musician
 Ricky Williams, professional football player, Heisman Trophy winner
 Ted Williams, professional baseball player, Hall of Famer, won 7 batting titles
 Trevor Williams, professional baseball player
 Ann Wilson, musician
 Jim Wilson, professional baseball pitcher and general manager
 Pete Wilson, mayor of San Diego, governor of California and U.S. Senator
 Scott Wilson, professional bodybuilder
 Kellen Winslow, professional football player, Hall of Famer
 Kellen Winslow II, professional football player and convicted rapist
 Cassidy Wolf, Miss Teen USA
 Harold Bell Wright, author, "Shepherd of the Hills" (1941)
 Mickey Wright, LPGA golfer, World Golf Hall of Famer
 Robin Wright, Golden Globe Award-winning actress
 Marvell Wynne II, professional soccer player

Z
 Frank Zappa, musician
 Joanna Zeiger (born 1970), Olympic and world champion triathlete, and author
 Valerie Ziegenfuss, professional tennis player
 Sal Zizzo, professional soccer player
 Joel Zumaya, professional baseball player

References 

 
San Diego
San Diego
People from San Diego